Gourav Mukhi is an Indian professional footballer who plays as a forward.

Club career
Mukhi was raised in Harijan Basti, Dhatkidih in Jamshedpur, Jharkhand and is the son of Chhotelal Mukhi, a former local amateur footballer. In June 2015, after representing Jharkhand in the Sub Juniors U15 Championship, Mukhi, along with four other players and his head coach, were suspended for submitting false birth certificates and playing while overaged.

Mukhi eventually joined Tata Steel in the local Jharkhand Football League and then joined the Jamshedpur FC B team. After performing well for the reserves in the I-League 2nd Division, Mukhi was signed for the first-team Jamshedpur side for the Indian Super League. He proceeded to make his professional debut for the club on 7 October 2018 against Bengaluru. Mukhi came on as a 71st-minute substitute for Jerry Mawihmingthanga and scored the equalizing goal for club ten minutes later to make it 1–1. The game soon ended 2–2 and Mukhi earned the ISL Emerging Player of the Match award.

On 20 November 2018, Mukhi was suspended by the AIFF for six months after admitting to age-fraud. In 2018, Mukhi claimed to be 16 years old but was revealed to be 21 years old after supposedly becoming the youngest player in ISL history. He was cleared to play by AIFF on 9 September 2019, after serving the suspension and providing correct age documents.

In January 2021, Mohammedan SC roped in the former Jamshedpur FC forward for the 2020–21 I-League season.

Career statistics

References

External links 
 Jamshedpur FC Profile.

Living people
Indian footballers
Jamshedpur FC players
Association football forwards
Footballers from Jharkhand
I-League 2nd Division players
Indian Super League players
1998 births
I-League players
Mohammedan SC (Kolkata) players